I Rivers is the pen name of an anonymous Singapore-born Malaysian author, whose first novel, Black Magic Woman # Zero Point Negro was published in 2004 by Fugue State Press.

Although biographical details are scant, an article  by Thor Kah Hoong states that Rivers' actual first name is Joe, and that he studied economics in the United States in the early 1990s; he may be presumed to have been born around 1970. He is married and is the father of one child.

His first novel was described by Arnold Skemer of ZYX Magazine as follows: "Certainly hallucinatory and oft breaking into song, this novel goes in many directions with names of characters from the realm of fantasy, such as 'Mother Mary,' 'Wild Flowers,' 'Fire Worm,' with verbiage of popular music sprinkled in. Word play is rampant, Greek choruses of extravagant supplications, summonings of imagery, evocations, Q & A of acute tension. The reader wanders on a sea of rhetoric, drifting into ever more colorful tempests of verbal fantasy. In this sea of verbiage, the next plot twist is the next verbal conundrum and spasm of preachment, the next dollop of mad invocation. It goes on from page to page, a never-ending kaleidoscope of story in labyrinths of twists and turns of utterance. In the background is the mad laughter of the funhouse; in the foreground, the strange declamations of disembodied voices that take center stage, then rapidly disappear into the variegated swarm of verbal encounter."

References

Malaysian writers
Postmodern writers
Living people
21st-century pseudonymous writers
Year of birth missing (living people)